Statistics of the Scottish Football League in season 1978–79.

Scottish Premier Division

Scottish First Division

Scottish Second Division

See also
1978–79 in Scottish football

References

 
Scottish Football League seasons